Corine refers to Coordination of Information on the Environment, a programme of the European Union

Corine or CORINE may also refer to:

 Corine (given name), people with the name
 Corine, Texas, an unincorporated community
 Corine Literature Prize, a German literature prize

See also 
 Korine, a surname
 Corinne (disambiguation)
 Corrine (disambiguation)
 Coreen